Vladimir Cukavac (Serbian Cyrillic: Владимир Цукавац; 29 May 1884 – 7 April 1965) was a Serbian general holding the title of army general in the Royal Yugoslav Army. He commanded the 5th Army during the German-led Axis invasion of Yugoslavia of April 1941 during World War II. He also served as the 23rd Dean of the Academic Board of the Yugoslav Military Academy and was its chief from 1936 to 1940.

Career
Cukavac's command consisted of the Timok, Toplica, Drina, Morava and Kosovo Divisions, and Vlasnica and Kalna Detachments. The 5th Army was responsible for the Romanian and Bulgarian borders between the Iron Gates and the Greek border. 

In 1934, he was awarded the Legion of Honour.

References

References
 
 

1884 births
1965 deaths
Military personnel from Valjevo
People from the Kingdom of Serbia
Serbian generals
Recipients of the Legion of Honour
Royal Yugoslav Army personnel of World War II
Army general (Kingdom of Yugoslavia)
World War II prisoners of war held by Germany
Burials at Belgrade New Cemetery